Grand Traverse Light is a lighthouse in the U.S. state of Michigan, located at the tip of the Leelanau Peninsula, which separates Lake Michigan and Grand Traverse Bay. It marks the Manitou passage, where Lake Michigan elides into Grand Traverse Bay. In 1858, the present light was built, replacing a separate round tower  built in 1852. This area, in the Michigan wine country, is commonly visited by tourists during the summer months.

History
Some call this "Cat's Head Point Light." It is also locally called Northport Light, in honor of the nearby town of Northport.

The first version of this light, which no longer exists, was ordered built by President Millard Fillmore in July 1850. A brick tower with separate keeper's quarters was constructed at a site east of the present Lighthouse in the state park campground. This first house and tower were deemed inadequate and razed in 1858 when the present structure was built. Still visible is a portion of the lighthouse foundation and the original tower site was located in 1999.

The 1858 light is listed in the National Register of Historic Places, Reference #84001799, Name of Listing: GRAND TRAVERSE LIGHT (U.S. COAST GUARD/GREAT LAKES TR).  It is also on the State List/Inventory having been listed in 1991.  Alpena, Michigan's Fourth Order Fresnel Lens is on display in the lighthouse keeper's house.  The complex is listed as Michigan Registered Site S0615, and a state historical marker was erected in 1993.

Today, one can tour the restored lighthouse resembling a keeper's home of the 1920s and 1930s. Exhibits on area lighthouses, foghorns, shipwrecks and local history are located in the Lighthouse and Fog Signal Building. The restored air diaphone foghorn is demonstrated throughout the year, and visitors can climb the tower for views of Lake Michigan. An admission fee is charged.

References

Further reading

 Crompton, Samuel Willard  & Michael J. Rhein, The Ultimate Book of Lighthouses (2002) ; .
 Hyde, Charles K., and Ann and John Mahan. The Northern Lights: Lighthouses of the Upper Great Lakes.  Detroit: Wayne State University Press, 1995.    .
 Jones, Ray & Bruce Roberts, American Lighthouses (Globe Pequot, September 1, 1998, 1st Ed.) ; .
 Jones, Ray,The Lighthouse Encyclopedia, The Definitive Reference (Globe Pequot, January 1, 2004, 1st ed.) ; .
 Noble, Dennis, Lighthouses & Keepers: U. S. Lighthouse Service and Its Legacy (Annapolis: U. S. Naval Institute Press, 1997). ; .
 Oleszewski, Wes, Great Lakes Lighthouses, American and Canadian: A Comprehensive Directory/Guide to Great Lakes Lighthouses, (Gwinn, Michigan: Avery Color Studios, Inc., 1998) .
 Penrod, John, Lighthouses of Michigan, (Berrien Center, Michigan: Penrod/Hiawatha, 1998)  .
 Penrose, Laurie and Bill, A Traveler’s Guide to 116 Michigan Lighthouses (Petoskey, Michigan: Friede Publications, 1999).  
 
 Putnam, George R., Lighthouses and Lightships of the United States, (Boston: Houghton Mifflin Co., 1933).
 United States Coast Guard, Aids to Navigation, (Washington, DC: U. S. Government Printing Office, 1945).
 
 
 Wagner, John L., Michigan Lighthouses: An Aerial Photographic Perspective, (East Lansing, Michigan: John L. Wagner, 1998)  .
 Wargin, Ed, Legends of Light: A Michigan Lighthouse Portfolio (Ann Arbor Media Group, 2006).  .
 Wright, Larry and Wright, Patricia, Great Lakes Lighthouses Encyclopedia Hardback (Erin: Boston Mills Press, 2006) .

External links

 Detroit News, Interactive map on Michigan lighthouses.
 Grand Traverse Lighthouse official site
 
 Michigan Lighthouse Conservancy, Grand Traverse Light.
 National Park Service Maritime Heritage, Inventory of Historic Light Stations Grand Traverse Light.
 Terry Pepper, Grand Traverse lighthouse at Seeing the Light.
 

Lighthouses completed in 1852
Houses completed in 1852
Lighthouses completed in 1858
Houses completed in 1858
Lighthouses on the National Register of Historic Places in Michigan
1852 establishments in Michigan
National Register of Historic Places in Leelanau County, Michigan